Juan Martín Pereyra is an Argentine swimmer. He has represented Argentina at three consecutive Summer Olympics.

At the 2004 Summer Olympics, he competed in the men's 200 metre freestyle, 400 metre freestyle and the 1500 metre freestyle, finishing in 40th, 27th and 26th respectively.

At the 2008 and 2012 Summer Olympics, he competed in the 400 and 1500 metres.  In 2008, he finished in 35th and 34th respectively, while in 2012 he finished in 24th and 29th.

References

Argentine male swimmers
Living people
Pan American Games bronze medalists for Argentina
Olympic swimmers of Argentina
Swimmers at the 2004 Summer Olympics
Swimmers at the 2008 Summer Olympics
Swimmers at the 2012 Summer Olympics
Argentine male freestyle swimmers
1980 births
Swimmers at the 2015 Pan American Games
Swimmers at the 2011 Pan American Games
Pan American Games medalists in swimming
South American Games medalists in swimming
South American Games silver medalists for Argentina
South American Games bronze medalists for Argentina
Competitors at the 2006 South American Games
Competitors at the 2014 South American Games
Medalists at the 2011 Pan American Games
Medalists at the 2015 Pan American Games
Swimmers from Buenos Aires
21st-century Argentine people